Italy national bandy team made an appearance at the 1913 European Bandy Championships, which were played in Davos, Switzerland, but the outbreak of World War I then ended the interest for bandy in Italy.

Italy became a member of the Federation of International Bandy in 2003 but has not sent any team to an international competition.

References

National bandy teams
Bandy